The Walls Came Tumbling Down is a 1946 American film noir crime film directed by Lothar Mendes and starring Lee Bowman, Marguerite Chapman, Edgar Buchanan and George Macready.

Premise
A newspaper reporter investigates when one of his friends is murdered, a crime apparently connected to a missing art work.

Cast
 Lee Bowman as Gilbert Archer 
 Marguerite Chapman as Patricia Foster, AKA Laura Browning 
 Edgar Buchanan as Rev. George Bradford 
 George Macready as Matthew Stoker 
 Lee Patrick as Susan 
 Jonathan Hale as Captain Griffin 
 J. Edward Bromberg as Ernst Helms
 Elisabeth Risdon as Catherine Walsh 
 Miles Mander as Dr. Marko 
 Moroni Olsen as Bishop Martin 
 Katherine Emery as Mrs. Stoker 
 Noel Cravat as Rausch

References

Bibliography
 Spicer, Andrew. Historical Dictionary of Film Noir. Scarecrow Press, 2010.

External links

1946 films
American crime films
American black-and-white films
1946 crime films
Films directed by Lothar Mendes
Columbia Pictures films
1940s English-language films
1940s American films